Valery Yarmosh (born January 15, 1995) is a Ukrainian footballer who currently plays with Toronto Falcons in the Canadian Soccer League.

Career  
Yarmosh played in the Ukrainian Second League with FC Dynamo Khmelnytskyi in 2013. In 2017, he played in the Canadian Soccer League with FC Vorkuta. He primarily featured in the Second Division with FC Vorkuta B, and won the CSL DII Championship in 2018. For the 2019 season, he was loaned to expansion franchise Kingsman SC. 

In 2021, he assisted in securing Vorkuta's third regular-season title and secured the ProSound Cup against Scarborough. He also played in the 2021 playoffs where Vorkuta was defeated by Scarborough in the championship final.  

In 2022, he signed with the expansion franchise Toronto Falcons.

References  

1995 births
Living people
Ukrainian footballers
FC Dynamo Khmelnytskyi players
FC Continentals players
Canadian Soccer League (1998–present) players
Association football midfielders